Nichole Cheza (born June 11, 1987) is an American former professional dirt track motorcycle racer. She competed in the GNC1 class of the AMA Grand National Championship.

Cheza was born in Flint, Michigan and resides in Clio, Michigan. She started riding at the age of 3 and began racing at 4. In 2003, Cheza won championships in both, dirt track racing and ice track racing. Cheza was the American Motorcyclist Association's Female Rider for the Year for 2003.

She is married to professional motorcycle racer, Jared Mees.

References

External links

1987 births
Living people
Sportspeople from Flint, Michigan
American motorcycle racers
Female motorcycle racers
AMA Grand National Championship riders
American sportswomen
People from Clio, Michigan
21st-century American women